West Hartlepool Amateur Football & Athletic Company Limited was an English football club formed in 1881. The club played in amber and black halved shirts, black shorts, and black socks. At the time of formation, they were the town's biggest football club, remaining so until the founding in 1908 of Hartlepools United.

The club's greatest achievement occurred on 8 April 1905 when the club won the FA Amateur Cup beating Clapton, 3–2 at Shepherd's Bush, London.

They joined to the Northern League in 1898, playing in Division Two for two seasons before that division was disbanded, and then admitted to the single  division in 1900. They remained in that company until their demise, their highest finishing position being 4th in the 1907–08 season. They competed for a number of years in the qualifying rounds of the FA Cup, with their highlight being a run to the Fourth Qualifying Round in  the 1905–06 season, when they were eliminated by Barrow.

In June 1910, after 29 years, West Hartlepool Football Club folded. All the club's assets and liabilities were taken over by Hartlepools United.

External links
 History of West Hartlepool F.C.

Defunct football clubs in England
Association football clubs established in 1881
Association football clubs disestablished in 1910
Defunct football clubs in County Durham
1881 establishments in England
1910 disestablishments in England